The Bolivia national football team has represented Bolivia in international football since 1926. Organized by the Bolivian Football Federation, it is one of the 10 members of CONMEBOL. The team's first international was a 7–1 defeat to Chile on 12 October 1926 in the 1926 South American Championship

Players

References

 
Bolivia
Association football player non-biographical articles